The 51st United States Congress, referred to by some critics as the Billion Dollar Congress, was a meeting of the legislative branch of the United States federal government, consisting of the United States Senate and the United States House of Representatives. It met in Washington, D.C., from March 4, 1889, to March 4, 1891, during the first two years of Benjamin Harrison's presidency.

The apportionment of seats in this House of Representatives was based on the 1880 United States census.

The Republicans maintained their majority in the Senate, and won the majority in the House. With Benjamin Harrison being sworn in as president on March 4, 1889, This gave the Republicans an overall federal government trifecta for the first time since the 43rd Congress in 1873-1875.

Major events 

 March 4, 1889: Benjamin Harrison became President of the United States
 December 29, 1890: Wounded Knee Massacre

Major legislation 

It was responsible for a number of pieces of landmark legislation, many of which asserted the authority of the federal government.

Emboldened by their success in the elections of 1888, the Republicans enacted virtually their entire platform during their first 303-day session, including a measure that provided American Civil War veterans with generous pensions and expanded the list of eligible recipients to include noncombatants and the children of veterans. Grover Cleveland had vetoed a similar bill in 1887. It was criticized as the "Billion Dollar Congress'" for its lavish spending and, for this reason it incited drastic reversals in public support that led to Cleveland's reelection in 1892.

Other important legislation passed into law by the Congress included the McKinley tariff, authored by Representative, and future President, William McKinley; the Sherman Antitrust Act, which prohibited business combinations that restricted trade; and the Sherman Silver Purchase Act, which required the U.S. government to mint silver. The last two were concessions to Western farmer interests in exchange for support of the tariff and would become central tenets of the Populist Party later in the decade. They were authored by Senator John Sherman.

The Fifty-first Congress was also responsible for passing the Land Revision Act of 1891, which created the national forests. Harrison authorized America's first forest reserve in Yellowstone, Wyoming, the same year.

Other bills were discussed but failed to pass, including two significant pieces of legislation focused on ensuring African Americans the right to vote. Henry Cabot Lodge sponsored a so-called Lodge Bill that would have established federal supervision of Congressional elections so as to prevent the disfranchisement of southern blacks. Henry W. Blair sponsored the Blair Education Bill, which advocated the use of federal aid for education in order to frustrate southern whites employing literacy tests to prevent blacks from registering to vote.

 June 27, 1890: Dependent Pension Act
 July 2, 1890: Sherman Antitrust Act, ch. 647, 
 July 14, 1890: Sherman Silver Purchase Act, ch. 708, 
 August 30, 1890: Morrill Land-Grant Colleges Act
 October 1, 1890: McKinley Tariff, ch. 1244, 
 March 3, 1891: Forest Reserve Act of 1891
 March 3, 1891: Land Revision Act of 1891
 March 3, 1891: Immigration Act of 1891
 March 3, 1891: Merchant Marine Act of 1891
 March 3, 1891: International Copyright Act (The Chace Act)

States admitted and territories organized 
 November 2, 1889: North Dakota and South Dakota were admitted as the 39th and 40th states.
 November 8, 1889: Montana was admitted as the 41st state.
 November 11, 1889: Washington was admitted as the 42nd state.
 May 2, 1890: Oklahoma Territory was organized.
 July 3, 1890: Idaho was admitted as the 43rd state.
 July 10, 1890: Wyoming was admitted as the 44th state.

Party summary 

The count below identifies party affiliations at the beginning of this Congress. Changes resulting from subsequent replacements are shown below in the "Changes in membership" section.

Six new states were admitted during this Congress, and their senators and representatives were elected throughout the Congress.

Senate

House of Representatives

Leadership

Senate
President: Levi P. Morton (R)
 President pro tempore: John J. Ingalls (R), elected March 7, 1889
 Charles F. Manderson (R), elected March 2, 1891
 Republican Conference Chairman: George F. Edmunds
 Democratic Caucus Chairman: James B. Beck, until May 3, 1890
 Arthur P. Gorman, afterwards

House of Representatives
Speaker: Thomas B. Reed (R)
 Republican Conference Chairman: Thomas J. Henderson
 Democratic Caucus Chairman: William S. Holman
 Democratic Campaign Committee Chairman: James T. Jones

Members
This list is arranged by chamber, then by state. Senators are listed by class, and representatives are listed by district.

Skip to House of Representatives, below

Senate
Senators were elected by the state legislatures every two years, with one-third beginning new six-year terms with each Congress. Preceding the names in the list below are Senate class numbers, which indicate the cycle of their election. In this Congress, Class 1 meant their term began in the last Congress, requiring reelection in 1892; Class 2 meant their term began in this Congress, requiring reelection in 1894; and Class 3 meant their term ended in this Congress, requiring reelection in 1890.

Alabama 
 2. John T. Morgan (D)
 3. James L. Pugh (D)

Arkansas 
 2. James H. Berry (D)
 3. James K. Jones (D)

California 
 1. George Hearst (D), until February 28, 1891
 3. Leland Stanford (R)

Colorado 
 2. Edward O. Wolcott (R)
 3. Henry M. Teller (R)

Connecticut 
 1. Joseph R. Hawley (R)
 3. Orville H. Platt (R)

Delaware 
 1. George Gray (D)
 2. Anthony Higgins (R)

Florida 
 1. Samuel Pasco (D)
 3. Wilkinson Call (D)

Georgia 
 2. Alfred H. Colquitt (D)
 3. Joseph E. Brown (D)

Idaho 
 2. George L. Shoup (R), from December 18, 1890
 3. William J. McConnell (R), from December 18, 1890

Illinois 
 2. Shelby M. Cullom (R)
 3. Charles B. Farwell (R)

Indiana 
 1. David Turpie (D)
 3. Daniel W. Voorhees (D)

Iowa 
 2. James F. Wilson (R)
 3. William B. Allison (R)

Kansas 
 2. Preston B. Plumb (R)
 3. John J. Ingalls (R)

Kentucky 
 2. James B. Beck (D), until May 3, 1890
 John G. Carlisle (D), from May 26, 1890
 3. Joseph C. S. Blackburn (D)

Louisiana 
 2. Randall L. Gibson (D)
 3. James B. Eustis (D)

Maine 
 1. Eugene Hale (R)
 2. William P. Frye (R)

Maryland 
 1. Arthur Pue Gorman (D)
 3. Ephraim K. Wilson (D), until February 24, 1891

Massachusetts 
 1. Henry L. Dawes (R)
 2. George F. Hoar (R)

Michigan 
 1. Francis B. Stockbridge (R)
 2. James McMillan (R)

Minnesota 
 1. Cushman K. Davis (R)
 2. William D. Washburn (R)

Mississippi 
 1. James Z. George (D)
 2. Edward C. Walthall (D)

Missouri 
 1. Francis M. Cockrell (D)
 3. George G. Vest (D)

Montana 
 1. Wilbur F. Sanders (R), from January 1, 1890
 2. Thomas C. Power (R), from January 2, 1890

Nebraska 
 1. Algernon S. Paddock (R)
 2. Charles F. Manderson (R)

Nevada 
 1. William M. Stewart (R)
 3. John P. Jones (R)

New Hampshire 
 2. Gilman Marston (R), until June 18, 1889
 William E. Chandler (R), from June 18, 1889
 3. Henry W. Blair (R)

New Jersey 
 1. Rufus Blodgett (D)
 2. John R. McPherson (D)

New York 
 1. Frank Hiscock (R)
 3. William M. Evarts (R)

North Carolina 
 2. Matt W. Ransom (D)
 3. Zebulon B. Vance (D)

North Dakota 
 1. Lyman R. Casey (R), from November 25, 1889 
 3. Gilbert A. Pierce (R), from November 25, 1889

Ohio 
 1. John Sherman (R)
 3. Henry B. Payne (D)

Oregon 
 2. Joseph N. Dolph (R)
 3. John H. Mitchell (R)

Pennsylvania 
 1. Matthew S. Quay (R)
 3. J. Donald Cameron (R)

Rhode Island 
 1. Nelson W. Aldrich (R)
 2. Jonathan Chace (R), until April 9, 1889
 Nathan F. Dixon III (R), from April 10, 1889

South Carolina 
 2. Matthew C. Butler (D)
 3. Wade Hampton III (D)

South Dakota 
 2. Richard F. Pettigrew (R), from November 2, 1889 
 3. Gideon C. Moody (R), from November 2, 1889

Tennessee 
 1. William B. Bate (D)
 2. Isham G. Harris (D)

Texas 
 1. John H. Reagan (D)
 2. Richard Coke (D)

Vermont 
 1. George F. Edmunds (R)
 3. Justin S. Morrill (R)

Virginia 
 1. John W. Daniel (D)
 2. John S. Barbour Jr. (D)

Washington 
 1. John B. Allen (R), from November 20, 1889 
 3. Watson C. Squire (R), from November 20, 1889

West Virginia 
 1. Charles J. Faulkner (D)
 2. John E. Kenna (D)

Wisconsin 
 1. Philetus Sawyer (R)
 3. John C. Spooner (R)

Wyoming 
 1. Francis E. Warren (R), from November 24, 1890 
 2. Joseph M. Carey (R), from November 15, 1890

House of Representatives
The names of members of the House of Representatives are preceded by their district numbers.

Alabama 
 . Richard H. Clarke (D)
 . Hilary A. Herbert (D)
 . William C. Oates (D)
 . Louis W. Turpin (D), until June 4, 1890
 John V. McDuffie (R), from June 4, 1890
 . James E. Cobb (D)
 . John H. Bankhead (D)
 . William H. Forney (D)
 . Joseph Wheeler (D)

Arkansas 
 . William H. Cate (D), until March 5, 1890
 Lewis P. Featherstone (L), from March 5, 1890
 . Clifton R. Breckinridge (D), until September 5, 1890
 Clifton R. Breckinridge (D), from November 4, 1890
 . Thomas C. McRae (D)
 . John H. Rogers (D)
 . Samuel W. Peel (D)

California 
 . John J. De Haven (R), until October 1, 1890
 Thomas J. Geary (D), from December 9, 1890
 . Marion Biggs (D)
 . Joseph McKenna (R)
 . William W. Morrow (R)
 . Thomas J. Clunie (D)
 . William Vandever (R)

Colorado 
 . Hosea Townsend (R)

Connecticut 
 . William E. Simonds (R)
 . Washington F. Willcox (D)
 . Charles A. Russell (R)
 . Frederick Miles (R)

Delaware 
 . John B. Penington (D)

Florida 
 . Robert H. M. Davidson (D)
 . Robert Bullock (D)

Georgia 
 . Rufus E. Lester (D)
 . Henry G. Turner (D)
 . Charles F. Crisp (D)
 . Thomas W. Grimes (D)
 . John D. Stewart (D)
 . James H. Blount (D)
 . Judson C. Clements (D)
 . Henry H. Carlton (D)
 . Allen D. Candler (D)
 . George T. Barnes (D)

Idaho 
 . Willis Sweet (R), from October 1, 1890

Illinois 
 . Abner Taylor (R)
 . Frank Lawler (D)
 . William E. Mason (R)
 . George E. Adams (R)
 . Albert J. Hopkins (R)
 . Robert R. Hitt (R)
 . Thomas J. Henderson (R)
 . Charles A. Hill (R)
 . Lewis E. Payson (R)
 . Philip S. Post (R)
 . William H. Gest (R)
 . Scott Wike (D)
 . William M. Springer (D)
 . Jonathan H. Rowell (R)
 . Joseph G. Cannon (R)
 . George W. Fithian (D)
 . Edward Lane (D)
 . William S. Forman (D)
 . Richard W. Townshend (D), until March 9, 1889
 James R. Williams (D), from December 2, 1889
 . George Washington Smith (R)

Indiana 
 . William F. Parrett (D)
 . John H. O'Neall (D)
 . Jason B. Brown (D)
 . William S. Holman (D)
 . George W. Cooper (D)
 . Thomas M. Browne (R)
 . William D. Bynum (D)
 . Elijah V. Brookshire (D)
 . Joseph B. Cheadle (R)
 . William D. Owen (R)
 . Augustus N. Martin (D)
 . Charles A. O. McClellan (D)
 . Benjamin F. Shively (D)

Iowa 
 . John H. Gear (R)
 . Walter I. Hayes (D)
 . David B. Henderson (R)
 . Joseph H. Sweney (R)
 . Daniel Kerr (R)
 . John F. Lacey (R)
 . Edwin H. Conger (R), until October 3, 1890
 Edward R. Hays (R), from November 4, 1890
 . James P. Flick (R)
 . Joseph R. Reed (R)
 . Jonathan P. Dolliver (R)
 . Isaac S. Struble (R)

Kansas 
 . Edmund N. Morrill (R)
 . Edward H. Funston (R)
 . Bishop W. Perkins (R)
 . Thomas Ryan (R), until April 4, 1889
 Harrison Kelley (R), from December 2, 1889
 . John A. Anderson (R)
 . Erastus J. Turner (R)
 . Samuel R. Peters (R)

Kentucky 
 . William J. Stone (D)
 . William T. Ellis (D)
 . Isaac H. Goodnight (D)
 . Alexander B. Montgomery (D)
 . Asher G. Caruth (D)
 . John G. Carlisle (D), until May 26, 1890
 William W. Dickerson (D), from June 21, 1890
 . William C. P. Breckinridge (D)
 . James B. McCreary (D)
 . Thomas H. Paynter (D)
 . John H. Wilson (R)
 . Hugh F. Finley (R)

Louisiana 
 . Theodore S. Wilkinson (D)
 . Hamilton D. Coleman (R)
 . Edward J. Gay (D), until May 30, 1889
 Andrew Price (D), from December 2, 1889
 . Newton C. Blanchard (D)
 . Charles J. Boatner (D)
 . Samuel M. Robertson (D)

Maine 
 . Thomas B. Reed (R)
 . Nelson Dingley Jr. (R)
 . Seth L. Milliken (R)
 . Charles A. Boutelle (R)

Maryland 
 . Charles H. Gibson (D)
 . Herman Stump (D)
 . Henry W. Rusk (D)
 . Henry J. Stockbridge Jr. (R)
 . Barnes Compton (D), until March 20, 1890
 Sydney E. Mudd (R), from March 20, 1890
 . Louis E. McComas (R)

Massachusetts 
 . Charles S. Randall (R)
 . Elijah A. Morse (R)
 . John F. Andrew (D)
 . Joseph H. O'Neil (D)
 . Nathaniel P. Banks (R)
 . Henry Cabot Lodge (R)
 . William Cogswell (R)
 . Frederic T. Greenhalge (R)
 . John W. Candler (R)
 . Joseph H. Walker (R)
 . Rodney Wallace (R)
 . Francis W. Rockwell (R)

Michigan 
 . J. Logan Chipman (D)
 . Edward P. Allen (R)
 . James O'Donnell (R)
 . Julius C. Burrows (R)
 . Charles E. Belknap (R)
 . Mark S. Brewer (R)
 . Justin R. Whiting (D)
 . Aaron T. Bliss (R)
 . Byron M. Cutcheon (R)
 . Frank W. Wheeler (R)
 . Samuel M. Stephenson (R)

Minnesota 
 . Mark H. Dunnell (R)
 . John Lind (R)
 . Darwin S. Hall (R)
 . Samuel P. Snider (R)
 . Solomon G. Comstock (R)

Mississippi 
 . John M. Allen (D)
 . James B. Morgan (D)
 . Thomas C. Catchings (D)
 . Clarke Lewis (D)
 . Chapman L. Anderson (D)
 . Thomas R. Stockdale (D)
 . Charles E. Hooker (D)

Missouri 
 . William H. Hatch (D)
 . Charles H. Mansur (D)
 . Alexander M. Dockery (D)
 . Robert P. C. Wilson (D), from December 2, 1889
 . John C. Tarsney (D)
 . John T. Heard (D)
 . Richard H. Norton (D)
 . Frederick G. Niedringhaus (R)
 . Nathan Frank (R)
 . William M. Kinsey (R)
 . Richard P. Bland (D)
 . William J. Stone (D)
 . William H. Wade (R)
 . James P. Walker (D), until July 19, 1890
 Robert H. Whitelaw (D), from November 4, 1890

Montana 
 . Thomas H. Carter (R), from November 8, 1889

Nebraska 
 . William J. Connell (R)
 . James Laird (R), until August 17, 1889
 Gilbert L. Laws (R), from December 2, 1889
 . George W. E. Dorsey (R)

Nevada 
 . Horace F. Bartine (R)

New Hampshire 
 . Alonzo Nute (R)
 . Orren C. Moore (R)

New Jersey 
 . Christopher A. Bergen (R)
 . James Buchanan (R)
 . Jacob A. Geissenhainer (D)
 . Samuel Fowler (D)
 . Charles D. Beckwith (R)
 . Herman Lehlbach (R)
 . William McAdoo (D)

New York 
 . James W. Covert (D)
 . Felix Campbell (D)
 . William C. Wallace (R)
 . John M. Clancy (D)
 . Thomas F. Magner (D)
 . Frank T. Fitzgerald (D), until November 4, 1889
 Charles H. Turner (D), from December 9, 1889
 . Edward J. Dunphy (D)
 . John H. McCarthy (D), until January 14, 1891, vacant thereafter
 . Samuel S. Cox (D), until September 10, 1889
 Amos J. Cummings (D), from November 5, 1889
 . Francis B. Spinola (D)
 . John Quinn (D)
 . Roswell P. Flower (D)
 . Ashbel P. Fitch (D)
 . William G. Stahlnecker (D)
 . Moses D. Stivers (R)
 . John H. Ketcham (R)
 . Charles J. Knapp (R)
 . John A. Quackenbush (R)
 . Charles Tracey (D)
 . John Sanford (R)
 . John H. Moffitt (R)
 . Frederick Lansing (R)
 . James S. Sherman (R)
 . David Wilber (R), until April 1, 1890
 John S. Pindar (D), from November 4, 1890
 . James J. Belden (R)
 . Milton De Lano (R)
 . Newton W. Nutting (R), until October 15, 1889
 Sereno E. Payne (R), from December 2, 1889
 . Thomas S. Flood (R)
 . John Raines (R)
 . Charles S. Baker (R)
 . John G. Sawyer (R)
 . John M. Farquhar (R)
 . John McClure Wiley (D)
 . William G. Laidlaw (R)

North Carolina 
 . Thomas G. Skinner (D)
 . Henry P. Cheatham (R)
 . Charles W. McClammy (D)
 . Benjamin H. Bunn (D)
 . John M. Brower (R)
 . Alfred Rowland (D)
 . John S. Henderson (D)
 . William H. H. Cowles (D)
 . Hamilton G. Ewart (R)

North Dakota 
 . Henry C. Hansbrough (R), from November 2, 1889

Ohio 
 . Benjamin Butterworth (R)
 . John A. Caldwell (R)
 . Elihu S. Williams (R)
 . Samuel S. Yoder (D)
 . George E. Seney (D)
 . Melvin M. Boothman (R)
 . Henry L. Morey (R)
 . Robert P. Kennedy (R)
 . William C. Cooper (R)
 . William E. Haynes (D)
 . Albert C. Thompson (R)
 . Jacob J. Pugsley (R)
 . Joseph H. Outhwaite (D)
 . Charles P. Wickham (R)
 . Charles H. Grosvenor (R)
 . James W. Owens (D)
 . Joseph D. Taylor (R)
 . William McKinley (R)
 . Ezra B. Taylor (R)
 . Martin L. Smyser (R)
 . Theodore E. Burton (R)

Oregon 
 . Binger Hermann (R)

Pennsylvania 
 . Henry H. Bingham (R)
 . Charles O'Neill (R)
 . Samuel J. Randall (D), until April 13, 1890
 Richard Vaux (D), from May 20, 1890
 . William D. Kelley (R), until January 9, 1890
 John E. Reyburn (R), from February 18, 1890
 . Alfred C. Harmer (R)
 . Smedley Darlington (R)
 . Robert M. Yardley (R)
 . William Mutchler (D)
 . David B. Brunner (D)
 . Marriott Brosius (R)
 . Joseph A. Scranton (R)
 . Edwin S. Osborne (R)
 . James B. Reilly (D)
 . John W. Rife (R)
 . Myron B. Wright (R)
 . Henry C. McCormick (R)
 . Charles R. Buckalew (D)
 . Louis E. Atkinson (R)
 . Levi Maish (D)
 . Edward Scull (R)
 . Samuel A. Craig (R)
 . John Dalzell (R)
 . Thomas M. Bayne (R)
 . Joseph W. Ray (R)
 . Charles C. Townsend (R)
 . William C. Culbertson (R)
 . Lewis F. Watson (R), until August 25, 1890
 Charles W. Stone (R), from November 4, 1890
 . James Kerr (D)

Rhode Island 
 . Henry J. Spooner (R)
 . Warren O. Arnold (R)

South Carolina 
 . Samuel Dibble (D)
 . George D. Tillman (D)
 . James S. Cothran (D)
 . William H. Perry (D)
 . John J. Hemphill (D)
 . George W. Dargan (D)
 . William Elliott (D), until September 23, 1890
 Thomas E. Miller (R), from September 24, 1890

South Dakota 
Both representatives were elected statewide on a general ticket.(2 Republicans)
 . Oscar S. Gifford (R), from November 2, 1889
 . John A. Pickler (R), from November 2, 1889

Tennessee 
 . Alfred A. Taylor (R)
 . Leonidas C. Houk (R)
 . Henry Clay Evans (R)
 . Benton McMillin (D)
 . James D. Richardson (D)
 . Joseph E. Washington (D)
 . Washington C. Whitthorne (D)
 . Benjamin A. Enloe (D)
 . Rice A. Pierce (D)
 . James Phelan Jr. (D), until January 30, 1891, vacant thereafter

Texas 
 . Charles Stewart (D)
 . William H. Martin (D)
 . Constantine B. Kilgore (D)
 . David B. Culberson (D)
 . Silas Hare (D)
 . Joseph Abbott (D)
 . William H. Crain (D)
 . Littleton W. Moore (D)
 . Roger Q. Mills (D)
 . Joseph D. Sayers (D)
 . Samuel W. T. Lanham (D)

Vermont 
 . John W. Stewart (R)
 . William W. Grout (R)

Virginia 
 . Thomas H. B. Browne (R)
 . George E. Bowden (R)
 . George D. Wise (D), until April 10, 1890
 Edmund Waddill Jr. (R), from April 12, 1890
 . Edward C. Venable (D), until September 23, 1890
 John M. Langston (R), from September 23, 1890
 . Posey G. Lester (D)
 . Paul C. Edmunds (D)
 . Charles T. O'Ferrall (D)
 . William H. F. Lee (D)
 . John A. Buchanan (D)
 . Henry St. George Tucker III (D)

Washington 
 . John L. Wilson (R), from November 20, 1889

West Virginia 
 . John O. Pendleton (D), until February 26, 1890
 George W. Atkinson (R), from February 26, 1890
 . William L. Wilson (D)
 . John D. Alderson (D)
 . James M. Jackson (D), until February 3, 1890
 Charles B. Smith (R), from February 3, 1890

Wisconsin 
 . Lucien B. Caswell (R)
 . Charles Barwig (D)
 . Robert M. La Follette (R)
 . Isaac W. Van Schaick (R)
 . George H. Brickner (D)
 . Charles B. Clark (R)
 . Ormsby B. Thomas (R)
 . Nils P. Haugen (R)
 . Myron H. McCord (R)

Wyoming 
 . Clarence D. Clark (R), from December 1, 1890

Non-voting members 
 . Marcus A. Smith (D)
 . George A. Mathews (R), until November 2, 1889
 . Fred Dubois (R), until July 3, 1890
 . Thomas H. Carter (R), until November 7, 1889
 . Antonio Joseph (D)
 . David A. Harvey (R), from November 4, 1890
 . John T. Caine (D)
 . John B. Allen (R), until November 11, 1889
 . Joseph M. Carey (R), until July 10, 1890

Changes in membership
The count below reflects changes from the beginning of the first session of this Congress.

Senate 
 Replacements: 3
 Democratic: no net change
 Republican: no net change
 Liberal Republican: 1-seat net loss
 Deaths: 3
 Resignations: 2
 Interim appointments: 1
 Seats of newly admitted states: 12
Total seats with changes: 17

House of Representatives 
 Replacements: 16
 Democratic: 2-seat net gain
 Republican: 2-seat net loss
 Deaths: 11
 Resignations: 6
 Contested election:8
 Seats of newly admitted states: 7
Total seats with changes: 33

Committees

Senate

 Additional Accommodations for the Library of Congress (Select) (Chairman: Daniel W. Voorhees; Ranking Member: William M. Evarts)
 Agriculture and Forestry (Chairman: Algernon S. Paddock; Ranking Member: James Z. George)
 Appropriations (Chairman: William B. Allison; Ranking Member: Francis M. Cockrell)
 Audit and Control the Contingent Expenses of the Senate (Chairman: John P. Jones; Ranking Member: Zebulon B. Vance)
 Canadian Relations (Select) (Chairman: George F. Hoar; Ranking Member: James L. Pugh)
 Census (Chairman: Eugene Hale; Ranking Member: James H. Berry)
 Civil Service and Retrenchment (Chairman: Edward O. Wolcott; Ranking Member: Edward C. Walthall)
 Claims (Chairman: John C. Spooner; Ranking Member: James K. Jones)
 Coast Defenses (Chairman: Joseph N. Dolph; Ranking Member: John R. McPherson)
 Commerce (Chairman: William P. Frye; Ranking Member: Matt W. Ransom)
 Distributing Public Revenue Among the States (Select)
 District of Columbia (Chairman: John J. Ingalls; Ranking Member: Isham G. Harris)
 Education and Labor (Chairman: Henry W. Blair; Ranking Member: James Z. George)
 Engrossed Bills (Chairman: Francis M. Cockrell; Ranking Member: Shelby M. Cullom)
 Enrolled Bills (Chairman: Charles B. Farwell; Ranking Member: Wilbur F. Sanders)
 Epidemic Diseases (Chairman: Isham G. Harris; Ranking Member: Eugene Hale)
 Establish a University in the United States (Select) (Chairman: George F. Edmunds; Ranking Member: Isham G. Harris)
 Examine the Several Branches in the Civil Service (Chairman: Anthony Higgins; Ranking Member: George Gray)
 Executive Departments Methods (Select)
 Finance (Chairman: Justin S. Morrill; Ranking Member: Daniel W. Voorhees)
 Fisheries (Chairman: Francis B. Stockbridge; Ranking Member: Wade Hampton III)
 Five Civilized Tribes of Indians (Select) (Chairman: Matthew C. Butler; Ranking Member: J. Donald Cameron)
 Foreign Relations (Chairman: John Sherman; Ranking Member: John T. Morgan) 
 Immigration (Chairman: William E. Chandler; Ranking Member: John R. McPherson)
 Indian Affairs (Chairman: Henry L. Dawes; Ranking Member: John T. Morgan)
 Interstate Commerce (Chairman: Shelby M. Cullom; Ranking Member: Isham G. Harris)
 Irrigation and Reclamation of Arid Lands (Select) (Chairman: William M. Stewart; Ranking Member: Edward C. Walthall)
 Judiciary (Chairman: George F. Edmunds; Ranking Member: James L. Pugh) 
 Library (Chairman: William M. Evarts; Ranking Member: Daniel W. Voorhees)
 Manufactures (Chairman: James McMillan; Ranking Member: Alfred H. Colquitt)
 Military Affairs (Chairman: Joseph R. Hawley; Ranking Member: Francis M. Cockrell)
 Mines and Mining (Chairman: William M. Stewart; Ranking Member: William B. Bate)
 Mississippi River and its Tributaries (Select) (Chairman: William D. Washburn; Ranking Member: Edward C. Walthall)
 Naval Affairs (Chairman: J. Donald Cameron; Ranking Member: John R. McPherson)
 Nicaraguan Claims (Select) (Chairman: John Tyler Morgan; Ranking Member: George F. Hoar)
 Organization, Conduct and Expeditures of the Executive Departments (Chairman: Frank Hiscock; Ranking Member: Francis M. Cockrell)
 Patents (Chairman: Henry M. Teller; Ranking Member: George Gray)
 Pensions (Chairman: Cushman K. Davis; Ranking Member: Gilbert A. Pierce)
 Post Office and Post Roads (Chairman: Philetus Sawyer; Ranking Member: Nathan F. Dixon)
 Potomac River Front (Select) (Chairman: John R. McPherson; Ranking Member: Charles F. Manderson)
 Printing (Chairman: Charles F. Manderson; Ranking Member: Arthur P. Gorman)
 Private Land Claims (Chairman: Matt W. Ransom; Ranking Member: William M. Stewart)
 Privileges and Elections (Chairman: George F. Hoar; Ranking Member: Zebulon B. Vance)
 Public Buildings and Grounds (Chairman: Leland Stanford; Ranking Member: George G. Vest)
 Public Lands (Chairman: Preston B. Plumb; Ranking Member: Richard F. Pettigrew)
 Quadrocentennial (Select) (Chairman: Frank Hiscock; Ranking Member: James B. Eustis)
 Railroads (Chairman: John H. Mitchell; Ranking Member: Joseph E. Brown)
 Revision of the Laws (Chairman: James F. Wilson; Ranking Member: Ephraim K. Wilson)
 Revolutionary Claims (Chairman: Richard Coke; Ranking Member: Justin S. Morrill)
 Rules (Chairman: Nelson W. Aldrich; Ranking Member: Isham G. Harris)
 Senate Administrative Services (Select)
 Tariff Regulation (Select)
 Territories (Chairman: Orville H. Platt; Ranking Member: Gilbert A. Pierce)
 Transportation and Sale of Meat Products (Select) (Chairman: George G. Vest; Ranking Member: Randall L. Gibson)
 Transportation Routes to the Seaboard (Chairman: Matthew S. Quay; Ranking Member: Randall L. Gibson)
 Whole
 Woman Suffrage (Select) (Chairman: Zebulon B. Vance; Ranking Member: Charles B. Farwell)

House of Representatives

 Accounts (Chairman: Henry J. Spooner; Ranking Member: Solomon G. Comstock)
 Agriculture (Chairman: Edward H. Funston; Ranking Member: William H. Hatch)
 Alcoholic Liquor Traffic (Select)
 Appropriations (Chairman: Joseph G. Cannon; Ranking Member: Mark S. Brewer)
 Banking and Currency (Chairman: George W.E. Dorsey; Ranking Member: Joseph R. Reed) 
 Claims (Chairman: William G. Laidlaw; Ranking Member: George W. Dargan)
 Coinage, Weights and Measures (Chairman: Charles P. Wickham; Ranking Member: Richard P. Bland)
 Commerce (Chairman: Charles S. Baker; Ranking Member: Henry Stockbridge Jr.)
 Disposition of Executive Papers
 District of Columbia (Chairman: William W. Grout; Ranking Member: John J. Hemphill)
 Education (Chairman: James O'Donnell; Ranking Member: Henry P. Cheatham)
 Elections (Chairman: Jonathan H. Rowell; Ranking Member: Solomon G. Comstock)
 Enrolled Bills (Chairman: Robert P. Kennedy; Ranking Member: Constantine B. Kilgore)
 Expenditures in the Agriculture Department (Chairman: Robert M. La Follette; Ranking Member: Edward Lane)
 Expenditures in the Interior Department (Chairman: Nathaniel P. Banks; Ranking Member: James D. Richardson)
 Expenditures in the Justice Department (Chairman: James S. Sherman; Ranking Member: John C. Tarsney)
 Expenditures in the Navy Department (Chairman: John G. Sawyer; Ranking Member: Judson C. Clements)
 Expenditures in the Post Office Department (Chairman: John M. Brower; Ranking Member: Thomas S. Flood)
 Expenditures in the State Department (Chairman: Joseph A. Scranton; Ranking Member: Marion Biggs)
 Expenditures in the Treasury Department (Chairman: Louis E. Atkinson; Ranking Member: William Cogswell)
 Expenditures in the War Department (Chairman: Robert M. Yardley; Ranking Member: William C.P. Breckinridge)
 Expenditures on Public Buildings (Chairman: Thomas S. Flood; Ranking Member: Joseph H. O'Neil)
 Foreign Affairs (Chairman: Robert R. Hitt; Ranking Member: Hamilton D. Coleman)
 Indian Affairs (Chairman: Bishop W. Perkins; Ranking Member: John L. Wilson)
 Invalid Pensions (Chairman: Edmund N. Morrill; Ranking Member: Gilbert L. Laws)
 Judiciary (Chairman: Ezra B. Taylor; Ranking Member: Joseph R. Reed)
 Labor (Chairman: William H. Wade; Ranking Member: Aaron T. Bliss) 
 Levees and Improvements of the Mississippi River (Chairman: Julius C. Burrows; Ranking Member: Charles D. Beckwith)
 Manufactures (Chairman: James Buchanan; Ranking Member: William D. Bynum)
 Merchant Marine and Fisheries (Chairman: John M. Farquhar; Ranking Member: Hamilton G. Ewart)
 Mileage (Chairman: John Lind; Ranking Member: Thomas J. Clunie)
 Military Affairs (Chairman: Byron M. Cutcheon; Ranking Member: Samuel P. Snider)
 Militia (Chairman: David B. Henderson; Ranking Member: Harrison Kelley)
 Mines and Mining (Chairman: Thomas H. Carter; Ranking Member: Myron H. McCord)
 Naval Affairs (Chairman: Charles A. Boutelle; Ranking Member: Hamilton D. Coleman)
 Pacific Railroads (Chairman: John Dalzell; Ranking Member: James P. Flick)
 Patents (Chairman: Benjamin Butterworth; Ranking Member: H. Clay Evans)
 Pensions (Chairman: Milton De Lano; Ranking Member: Thomas H. B. Browne)
 Printing (Chairman: Charles A. Russell; Ranking Member: James D. Richardson)
 Private Land Claims (Chairman: Lucien B. Caswell; Ranking Member: Hamilton G. Ewart)
 Post Office and Post Roads (Chairman: Henry H. Bingham; Ranking Member: James H. Blount)
 Public Buildings and Grounds (Chairman: Seth L. Milliken; Ranking Member: Oscar S. Gifford)
 Public Lands (Chairman: Lewis E. Payson; Ranking Member: William S. Holman)
 Railways and Canals (Chairman: Henry C. McCormick; Ranking Member: Gilbert L. Laws)
 Revision of Laws (Chairman: Thomas M. Browne; Ranking Member: Frederic T. Greenhalge)
 Rivers and Harbors (Chairman: Thomas J. Henderson; Ranking Member: Frederick G. Niedringhaus)
 Rules (Chairman: Charles F. Crisp; Ranking Member: James H. Blount) 
 Standards of Official Conduct
 Territories (Chairman: Isaac S. Struble; Ranking Member: George W. Smith)
 War Claims (Chairman: Ormsby B. Thomas; Ranking Member: Jonathan P. Dolliver)
 Ways and Means (Chairman: William McKinley; Ranking Member: Robert M. La Follette)
 Whole

Joint committees

 Conditions of Indian Tribes (Special)
 Disposition of (Useless) Executive Papers
 The Library
 Printing

Caucuses
 Democratic (House)
 Democratic (Senate)

Employees

Legislative branch agency directors
 Architect of the Capitol: Edward Clark
 Librarian of Congress: Ainsworth Rand Spofford 
 Public Printer of the United States: Thomas E. Benedict, until 1889 
 Francis W. Palmer, from 1889

Senate 
 Chaplain: John G. Butler (Lutheran)
 Secretary: Anson G. McCook
 Librarian: Alonzo M. Church
 Sergeant at Arms: William P. Canady, until June 30, 1890
 Edward K. Valentine, from June 30, 1890

House of Representatives 
 Chaplain: William H. Milburn (Methodist)
 Clerk: John B. Clark Jr., until December 2, 1889
 Edward McPherson, from December 2, 1889
 Doorkeeper: Charles E. Adams
 Postmaster: James L. Wheat, resigned October 1, 1890
 James W. Hathaway, elected December 10, 1890
 Clerk at the Speaker’s Table: Nathaniel T. Crutchfield
 Edward F. Goodwin
 Reading Clerks: John A. Reeve (D) and Azro J. Maxham (R)
 Sergeant at Arms: John P. Leedom, until December 2, 1889
 Adoniram J. Holmes, from December 2, 1889

See also 
 1888 United States elections (elections leading to this Congress)
 1888 United States presidential election
 1888–89 United States Senate elections
 1888 United States House of Representatives elections
 1890 United States elections (elections during this Congress, leading to the next Congress)
 1890–91 United States Senate elections
 1890 United States House of Representatives elections

Notes

References

External links
Biographical Directory of the U.S. Congress
U.S. House of Representatives: House History
U.S. Senate: Statistics and Lists